Ars Disputandi (Latin: the art of debate) was an online peer-reviewed academic journal of the philosophy of religion that was established in 2001 and published by Utrecht University's Igitur Publishing. It is abstracted and indexed in the ATLA Religion Database. In 2013 it was incorporated into the International Journal of Philosophy and Theology, which was previously known as Bijdragen: International Journal for Philosophy and Theology.

See also 
 List of theological journals

References

External links 
 

Religious studies journals
English-language journals
Philosophy journals
Publications established in 2001
Academic journals published by university presses
Utrecht University